Veer Surendra Sai Airport , also known as Jharsuguda Airport, is a domestic airport serving Jharsuguda, Odisha, India. The airport is named after the revolutionary Veer Surendra Sai and it is the second commercial airport in the state of Odisha. The airport caters to areas like districts of Jharsuguda, Sambalpur, Sundergarh as well as Angul.

History
The airfield was used during World War II by the RAF and other Allied Forces to counter Indian freedom fighters led by Subhas Chandra Bose. After India gained Independence from the British, the airfield was abandoned.

In July 2013, the Government of Odisha sanctioned ₹50 crores to kick-start the  175-crore airport development project which was to be jointly executed by the Airports Authority of India (AAI) and the state government. On 30 July 2014, Odisha government signed a memorandum of understanding (MoU) with the Airports Authority of India for the mentioned.

In August 2018, the airport received a 4C category licence from the Directorate General of Civil Aviation (DGCA), making Jharsuguda the second commercial airport in Odisha after Biju Patnaik International Airport in Bhubaneswar. The airport is eligible to land A-320 type Airbus aircraft.

On 22 September 2018, Prime Minister Narendra Modi inaugurated the airport, in the presence of Odisha Governor Ganeshi Lal, Chief Minister Naveen Patnaik, Union Petroleum and Natural Gas Minister Dharmendra Pradhan, former Union Minister of Civil Aviation Suresh Prabhu and former Bargarh Lok Sabha Member Prabhas Singh.

Facilities

Terminal

The runway has capacity of land Airbus A321 and Boeing 767 aircraft. 

The airport was renamed after freedom fighter Veer Surendra Sai by the cabinet on November 1, 2018. The interiors of the terminal building depict local handcraft such as world famous Sambalpuri sari, Sambalpuri dance, artwork and tourist destinations of Odisha.

Airlines and destinations

Statistics

References

External links

Airports in Odisha
Jharsuguda district
Airports established in 2018
2018 establishments in Odisha